Bonnin is a surname. Notable people with the surname include:

Bernard Bonnin (1939–2009), Spanish Filipino actor
Gertrude Simmons Bonnin (1876–1938), Native American writer better known by her pen name Zitkala-Sa
Liz Bonnin (born 1970), Irish television presenter
 Mark Bonnin , physician, co-founder of the Nature Foundation in South Australia in 1981
Mary Bonnin, former Master Chief in the United States Navy

See also
Bonin (disambiguation)